Alex Sigal is a South Africa–based virologist at the Africa Health Research Institute (AHRI) in Durban, South Africa, Max Plank Institute for Infection Biology in Berlin, and University of KwaZulu-Natal in Durban. His work concentrates on evolution and persistence of the SARS-CoV-2 virus. His laboratory was the first to isolate the live B.1.351 (Beta) variant of SARS-CoV-2 first detected in South Africa. Sigal’s laboratory was also the first to report results on the ability of the Omicron variant to escape antibody neutralization in individuals who had two doses of the Pfizer BNT162b2 vaccine as well as from previous infections, with results also suggesting that vaccination combined with a booster or previous infection can offer protection from symptomatic infection with Omicron.

Education 
Sigal earned his bachelor's degree from the University of Toronto, Master's degree from the Weizmann Institute of Science, and PhD in Systems Biology from the Weizmann Institute of Science under the supervision of Uri Alon.

Research interests 
Sigal joined the laboratory of David Baltimore in 2007 at Caltech for his postdoctoral work where he worked on problems related to HIV virology. He joined AHRI 2013 in Durban, South Africa as a Max Planck Research Group Leader affiliated with the Max Planck Institute for Infection Biology in Berlin.  At AHRI he broadened his research to the study of drug-resistant tuberculosis and in 2020 to the SARS-CoV-2 virus.

Sigal's current core research is directed at understanding SARS-CoV-2 evolution and long term-persistence and its consequences for transmission, immune escape, and long Covid, with particular interest in the effects of co-infections such as HIV and TB, antibody neutralization, and cell-to-cell spread of SARS-CoV-2. In particular, Sigal's work has found that the Beta and Omicron variants can escape antibodies from previous infections and vaccinations  and that antibodies generated from previous infections with the Beta and Omicron variants may offer cross protection against other variants. In particular, antibodies from an infection with the Omicron variant appear to protect against infection with the Delta variant.

Awards 

 EMBO Fellow (2007)
 Human Frontiers Long-Term fellowship (2007)
 Human Frontiers Career Development Award (2013)

Selected publications

References

External links 

 
 African Health Research Institute (AHRI)

Living people
1970 births
Virologists
University of Toronto alumni
Weizmann Institute of Science alumni
Academic staff of Max Planck Society